The RGD-5 (Ruchnaya Granata Distantsionnaya, English "Hand Grenade Remote") is a post–World War II Soviet anti-personnel fragmentation grenade, designed in the early 1950s.  The RGD-5 was accepted into service with the Soviet Army in 1954. It was widely exported, and is still in service with many armies in the Middle East and the former Soviet bloc.

Description

The grenade is egg-shaped without ribbing, except for a lateral ridge where the two halves of the grenade join. The surface has a few small dimples with green or olive drab paint.

Typically, the RGD-5 uses the 3.2 to 4.2 second delay UZRG, UZRGM, or UZRGM-2 fuze, a universal Russian type also used in the RG-41, RG-42, and F1 grenades or the more modern DVM-78 fuze. It is also possible to screw a MUV booby-trap firing device into the fuze well.

It is still manufactured in Russia with copies produced in Bulgaria, China (as the Type 59) and Georgia. Millions of RGD-5s and its clones have been manufactured over the years and although not as advanced as more modern grenades specifically designed to penetrate CRISAT standard body armour, the RGD-5 is an effective and inexpensive weapon. A single RGD-5 grenade costs around $5 US, making it affordable.

Variants

Rifle grenade

The AK-47 can mount a (rarely used) cup-type grenade-launcher that fires standard Soviet RGD-5 hand-grenades. The soup-can shaped launcher is screwed onto the AK-47's muzzle.  It is prepared for firing by inserting a standard RGD-5 hand-grenade into the launcher, removing the safety pin, and inserting a special blank cartridge into the rifle's chamber.  With the butt-stock of the rifle on the ground it can be fired.

URG-N

The URG-N is a reusable training model of the RGD-5 with a modified fuze containing a tiny explosive charge which simulates the detonation of the grenade.  The body of this grenade is painted black with white markings.

China
 Type-59 - Chinese built variant.

Bulgaria
 RGO-78 - Bulgarian '70s variant with DVM-78 fuse. Grenade weighed 450 grams and contained 85 grams charge of TNT.
 RGN-86 - another Bulgarian modification with DVM-78 fuze. Weighed 265 grams and contained 57 grams charge of TNT.

Poland
 RGO-88 - Polish variant with А-IX-1 filling (95% RDX and 5% Phlegmatized explosive). 60 grams of explosive mass.

Users

Former
 : Used by the Panama Defense Forces

Usage in US president assassination attempt

On 10 May 2005, Vladimir Arutyunian, a Georgian citizen and ethnic Armenian, waited for the United States President George W. Bush and Georgian President Mikheil Saakashvili to speak in Tbilisi's central Liberty Square. When Bush began speaking, Arutyunian threw an RGD-5 hand grenade wrapped in a red plaid handkerchief toward the podium where Bush stood as he addressed the crowd. The grenade landed  from the podium, near where Saakashvili, his wife Sandra E. Roelofs, Laura Bush, and other officials were seated.

The grenade failed to detonate. Although original reports indicated that the grenade was not live, it was later revealed that it was. After Arutyunian pulled the pin and threw the grenade, it hit a girl, cushioning its impact. The red handkerchief remained wrapped around the grenade, and it prevented the striker lever from releasing. A Georgian security officer quickly removed the grenade, and Arutyunian disappeared, but was later arrested.

See also
 List of Russian weaponry

References

External links
 Photos of RGD-5 grenades at inert-ord.net
 Labelled diagram of an RGD-5 grenade
 RGD-5 data (in Russian)
 Various photos of Russian RGD-5s
 Photo of Chinese Type 59 grenade (RGD-5 clone)
 Video #2 of RGD-5 being thrown
 Video #3 of RGD-5 being thrown

Hand grenades of the Soviet Union
Cold War weapons of the Soviet Union
Fragmentation grenades
Military equipment introduced in the 1950s